Ch'undu station is a railway station in Kyŏnghŭng county, North Hamgyŏng province, North Korea. It is the terminus of the Ch'undu Line of the Korean State Railway.

The station was opened on 16 November 1929 by the Chosen Government Railway (Sentetsu) at the same time as the mainline of the East Tomun Line from Unggi (now Sŏnbong) to Sinasan.

References

Railway stations in North Korea
Railway stations opened in 1929